The Linux Test Project (usually referred to as LTP) is a body of regression tests and conformance tests designed to confirm the behavior of the Linux kernel as well as glibc.

The LTP is a joint project started by SGI, developed and maintained by IBM, Cisco, Fujitsu, SUSE, Red Hat and others. The project source code was migrated to git and is available on GitHub at https://github.com/linux-test-project/ltp.

In simple terms, The Linux Test Project is a group aimed at testing and improving Linux. The goal of the LTP is to deliver a suite of automated testing tools for Linux as well as publish the results of tests they run.

References

External links 
 
 Kernel test automation with LTP on LWN.net

Linux kernel
Linux organizations